Armance may refer to:

 Armance (novel), an 1827 romance novel by Stendhal
 Armance (river), a tributary of the Armançon in France